Battincourt is a village of Wallonia in the municipality of Aubange, district of Halanzy, located in the province of Luxembourg, Belgium.

The village church dates from the 19th century and contains stained glass windows commemorating people from the village who died during World War I. It also contains two medieval sculptures.

References

External links

Populated places in Luxembourg (Belgium)